Wing Commander Hugh Gordon Malcolm, VC (2 May 1917 – 4 December 1942) was a Scottish airman and a recipient of the Victoria Cross, the highest award for gallantry in the face of the enemy that can be awarded to British and Commonwealth forces.

Early life
Malcolm was born in Broughty Ferry, Dundee, and educated at Craigflower Preparatory School near Dunfermline and Glenalmond College in Perthshire.  He entered the Royal Air Force College Cranwell on 9 January 1936. In January 1938, Malcolm joined No. 26 (Army Co-operation) Squadron at Catterick. In May 1939, he suffered a serious head injury in a Westland Lysander crash.

Second World War
When the war started, Malcolm was serving with No. 17 Training Group. On 4 March 1941, he was promoted to flight lieutenant and was Air Liaison Officer on Lieutenant General Bernard Montgomery's general staff.

By the end of 1941 Malcolm had risen to the rank of squadron leader and joined No. 18 Squadron as a flight commander, flying the Bristol Blenheim and based in Suffolk.

During late 1942 in North Africa, Wing Commander Malcolm assumed commanded of No. 18 Squadron, flying the Bristol Blenheim Mk. V light bomber. Throughout his service in that sector, his skill and daring were of the highest order. He led two attacks on Bizerta airfield in Tunisia, pressing his attacks to effective conclusion.

On 17 November 1942, the squadron were detailed to carry out an attack on Bizerta, taking advantage of low cloud cover. Twenty miles from the target, the sky cleared, but despite the danger of continuing without a fighter escort, Malcolm decided to go ahead. Despite fierce opposition, the mission was a success with all bombs dropped within the airfield perimeter, and a Junkers Ju 52 and Messerschmitt Bf 109 were shot down, with other enemy aircraft damaged on the ground by machine-gun fire.

Malcolm was a 25-year-old wing commander when the following deed took place for which he was awarded the Victoria Cross. On 4 December, he led a thirteen-strong attack on an enemy fighter airfield near Chougui, Tunisia. On reaching the target, however, and starting the attack, the squadron was intercepted by an overwhelming force of enemy fighters from I and II. Gruppen JG 53, and 11 Staffel, JG 2. One by one, all his bombers were shot down, until he himself was shot down in flames.

Malcolm's aircraft crashed in flames some 15 miles west of the target. An infantry officer and two other men who arrived at the scene of the crash minutes later retrieved the body of navigator Pilot Officer James Robb. Malcolm, with Robb and gunner Pilot Officer James Grant, were buried in the Beja War Cemetery in a collective grave. Malcolm was posthumously awarded the Victoria Cross on 27 April 1943. His was the first Royal Air Force Victoria Cross to be won in North Africa.

Legacy
The RAF's Malcolm Clubs were named in his honour. These were welfare clubs for RAF personnel, which operated in several countries between 1943 and the early 1970s, although the club at RAF Wittering continued until the 1990s.  They are mentioned in Queen's Regulations.

Malcolm's Victoria Cross is on display in the Lord Ashcroft collection at the Imperial War Museum, London.

References

External links

Acting Wing Commander H.G. Malcolm in The Art of War exhibition at the UK National Archives

1917 births
1942 deaths
Royal Air Force wing commanders
British World War II pilots
British World War II bomber pilots
Royal Air Force personnel killed in World War II
Aviators killed by being shot down
Royal Air Force recipients of the Victoria Cross
British World War II recipients of the Victoria Cross
Graduates of the Royal Air Force College Cranwell
People from Broughty Ferry
Scottish airmen
People educated at Craigflower Preparatory School
People educated at Glenalmond College